Cowanesque is an unincorporated community in Tioga County, Pennsylvania, United States. Cowanesque had a post office from May 16, 1864, until June 16, 2007.

References

Unincorporated communities in Tioga County, Pennsylvania
Unincorporated communities in Pennsylvania